Ramón Arturo Peña Padilla (born May 5, 1962) is a Dominican former professional baseball relief pitcher who played one season for the Detroit Tigers of the Major League Baseball (MLB). He is the brother of former MLB catcher Tony Peña and the uncle of former pitcher Tony Peña Jr.

Career
Since Ramón was in the American League while Tony was playing for the St. Louis Cardinals of the National League, and since interleague play didn't begin until , the two brothers never played against each other in the major leagues.

His career was much shorter and less successful than those of his two relatives. In eight career regular season games, had a lifetime earned run average of 6.00, allowing twelve earned runs in eighteen innings, as well as a WHIP of 1.89. Although he didn't earn a decision in any of his eight appearances, he didn't pitch a game in which his team earned the win. He made his major league debut on April 27,  against the California Angels at Anaheim Stadium in Anaheim, California. Peña surrendered three runs on seven hits in 2 innings in a relief appearance in a 10-3 Tigers loss. Oddly, despite his rather high 6.00 earned run average, he did not surrender a home run to any of the 88 batters he faced in the major leagues.

During his five seasons in the Tigers' farm system, Peña served as a part-time closer for the Class-A Lakeland Tigers of the Florida State League, the Double-A Birmingham Barons of the Southern League, and the Triple-A Toledo Mud Hens of the International League before being recalled in 1989 to play for the Tigers.  In the minor leagues, Peña had a lifetime record of 34-33, an ERA of 3.05, as well as 50 saves.

Peña served as the Tigers’ special assistant to general manager Dave Dombrowski until he was fired on May 17, .

See also
Major League Baseball players from the Dominican Republic

References

External links

1962 births
Living people
Águilas Cibaeñas players
Baseball players at the 1979 Pan American Games
Birmingham Barons players
Detroit Tigers players
Dominican Republic expatriate baseball players in Mexico
Dominican Republic expatriate baseball players in the United States
Dominican Republic national baseball team players
Gulf Coast Pirates players
Glens Falls Tigers players
Industriales de Monterrey players
Lakeland Tigers players

Major League Baseball pitchers
Major League Baseball players from the Dominican Republic
Mexican League baseball pitchers
Pan American Games medalists in baseball
Pan American Games silver medalists for the Dominican Republic
People from Santiago de los Caballeros
Saraperos de Saltillo players
Toledo Mud Hens players
Medalists at the 1979 Pan American Games